Qaxmuğal (also, Kach-Mugal and Kakhmugal) is a village in the Qakh Rayon of Azerbaijan.

Etnotoponym
Mughal is a name used for Tatars & Mongols by the Muslim population. In the 13th century when Azerbaijan and the Caucasus was under the rule of the Mongols, some tribes have moved to Qakh, due to its incredible nature and pastures. Hence Qakh Mughal settlement was created.

Population
 In the span of many years since 13th century, local Caucasian people intermarried with the Turkic speaking "Mughals" in the settlement. 
In the census of 1869 the Tatars (Mughals) constituted of 95 families and by 1914 were accounted of 1090 heads.

References 

Populated places in Qakh District